Yekrag (Yekraq) is a rural locality (a selo) in Kheli-Penzhinsky Selsoviet, Tabasaransky District, Republic of Dagestan, Russia. The population was 155 as of 2010.

Geography 
Yekrag is located 12 km east of Khuchni (the district's administrative centre) by road. Pendzhi is the nearest rural locality.<ref>Расстояние от Екрага до Хучни</ref.

References 

Rural localities in Tabasaransky District